Shilaidaha is a village in Shilaidaha Union, Kumarkhali Upazila of Kushtia District in Bangladesh. The place is famous for Shilaidaha Kuthibari; a country house made by Dwarkanath Tagore. Rabindranath Tagore lived a part of life here and created some of his memorable poems while living here.

History 

Its former name is Khorshedpur, during the reign of British East India Company, a indigo-planter named Shelly built a house in this village, later people started to call the village age Shellydaha and the named changed to Shelaidaha. In 1807, Dwarkanath Tagore bought the village and made it his estate. He also bought the building (kuthi) as well. His grandson Rabindranath Tagore came to the village many times. Now the village is widely known for Shilaidaha Rabindra Kuthibari.

Literature 
During his stay Rabindranath Tagore wrote many of his famous poems, essays and short stories there. Among those some of the masterpieces are Sonar Tari, Katha o Kahini, Chitra, Chaitali, etc. He also translated many of his creations in English there. He also wrote most of the poems from Naibedya, Kheya and many of the songs from Gitanjali and Geetimalya. It was here, in Shelaidaha in 1912, that he started translating his Gitanjali into English, which earned him the Nobel Prize for literature in 1913.

Museum 
The reformation of Kuthi Bari has been completed under the Department of Archaeology, Ministry of Cultural Affairs. It now serves as a museum named 'Tagore Memorial Museum'. Many of the objects Tagore used are displayed here, such as his bed, wardrobe, iron chest, lawnmower, framed pictures, and last but not least his houseboat.

Festivals 
Several festivals are observed throughout the year in Kuthi Bari such as 25th Baishakh as Tagore's birth anniversary. It is a five-day-long festival. People from across the country as well as India and the rest of the world join this occasion to celebrate his birthday. The program includes discussion, cultural program, fair and staging of his plays.

Gallery

See also
 Rabindra Bharati Museum, at Jorasanko Thakur Bari, Kolkata, India
 Rabindra Bhaban Museum, Santiniketan, India

References

External links

 Shilaidaha Kuthibadi at banglapedia

Populated places in Khulna Division
Villages in Bangladesh
Kushtia District